Bouchercon is an annual convention of creators and devotees of mystery and detective fiction. It is named in honour of writer, reviewer, and editor Anthony Boucher; also the inspiration for the Anthony Awards, which have been issued at the convention since 1986. This page details Bouchercon XXIV and the 8th Anthony Awards ceremony.

Bouchercon
The convention was held in Omaha, Nebraska on October 1, 1993; running until the 3rd. The event was chaired by bookseller Charles Levitt.

Special Guests
Lifetime Achievement awards — Hammond Innes & Ralph McInerny
Guest of Honor — Ed McBain
Fan guest of Honor — Don Sandstrom
Toastmaster — Ori Hardy-Sayles

Anthony Awards
The following list details the awards distributed at the eighth annual Anthony Awards ceremony.

Novel award
Winner:
Margaret Maron, Bootlegger's Daughter

Shortlist:
Robert Crais, Lullaby Town
John Dunning, Booked to Die
Carolyn Hart, Southern Ghost
Sharyn McCrumb, The Hangman's Beautiful Daughter

First novel award
Winner:
Barbara Neely, Blanche on the Lam

Shortlist:
Susan Wittig Albert, Thyme of Death
Carol Higgins Clark, Decked
Michael Connelly, The Black Echo
Charlene Weir, The Winter Widow

Short story award
Winner:
Diane Mott Davidson, "Cold Turkey", from Sisters in Crime 5

Shortlist:
Doug Allyn, "Candles in the Rain", from Ellery Queen's Mystery Magazine November 1992
Edward D. Hoch, "The Summer of Our Discontent", from Ellery Queen's Mystery Magazine November 1992
Gabrielle Kraft, "One Hit Wonder", from Sisters in Crime 5
Rochelle Krich, "A Golden Opportunity", from Sisters in Crime 5

Critical / Non-fiction award
Winner:
Ellen Nehr, Doubleday Crime Club Compendium 1928-1991

Shortlist:
David Coomes, Dorothy L. Sayers: A Careless Rage for Life
John Loughery, Alias S.S. Van Dine

True crime award
Winner:
Barbara D'Amato, The Doctor, the Murder, the Mystery: The True Story of the Dr. John Branion Murder Case

Shortlist:
Jana Bommersbach & Bruce Henderson, The Trunk Murderess: Winnie Ruth Judd
Thomas H. Cook & William Wright, Blood Echoes: The True Story of an Infamous Mass Murder and Its Aftermath
Philip E. Ginsburg & Eric Stover, The Shadow Of Death : The Hunt for a Serial Killer
Ann Rule, Everything She Ever Wanted: A True Story of Obsessive Love, Murder, and Betrayal

Motion picture award
Winner:
The Crying Game

Shortlist:
The Bodyguard
A Few Good Men
The Player
Single White Female

References

Anthony Awards
24
1993 in Nebraska